is a former Japanese Nippon Professional Baseball player.

External links

 Career statistics - NPB.jp 
 78 Yosuke Hiraishi PLAYERS2021 - Fukuoka SoftBank Hawks Official site

1980 births
Living people
Baseball people from Ōita Prefecture
Doshisha University alumni
Japanese baseball players
Tohoku Rakuten Golden Eagles players
Managers of baseball teams in Japan
Tohoku Rakuten Golden Eagles managers